Royal Flush (born Ramel T. Govantes on May 12, 1975)
is an American East Coast rapper from Flushing, Queens, New York.  He is a friend of Mic Geronimo and appeared on many songs with him.  His 1997 debut album, Ghetto Millionaire, featured production from Buckwild, L.E.S., Da Beatminerz and some verses from Noreaga in various songs, and received critical acclaim. His second album Street Boss was released in 2005, to mixed reviews. Since 2017 he has been a regular cast member of the NYC based FM radio program The Ryan Show.

Discography

Albums
Ghetto Millionaire (1997)
Street Boss (2005)
Grand Capo (2014)
The Governor (2019)

Appearances
1995: 8 songs from the Mic Geronimo album The Natural
2002: "Caught Up" (featuring Mack 10 & Royal Flush) The Trials and Tribulations of Russell Jones
2002:"I Wanna Fuck" (featuring Royal Flush) The Trials and Tribulations of Russell Jones
2003: "Flamboyant 2" (from the Big L album Harlem's Finest - A Freestyle History)
2005: "If Y'all Want War" (from the Ol' Dirty Bastard album Osirus)
2006: "Double Up" featuring Big L and Kool G Rap
2007: "Bullseye" (from the NYG'z album Welcome 2 G-Dom)
2007: "Cut That Weak Shit (Remix)" (from the Buckwild album Buckwild: Diggin' in the Crates)
2008: "Questions" (from the Pete Rock album NY's Finest)
2009: "Everybody Raps (featuring Mic Geronimo)" from the album Mass Movementz:The Album
2009: "Rotten Apple (Spoiled Mix)" (from the Tokimonsta mix tape "Attention Deficit")

References

External links 

Rappers from New York City
Living people
1975 births
People from Queens, New York
Underground rappers
21st-century American rappers